Yate is a town and civil parish in South Gloucestershire, England.

Developing from a small village into a town from the 1950s onwards, the 2011 census listed Yate's parish population as 21,789. The market town of Chipping Sodbury (population 5,045) is contiguous with Yate to the east. In addition, a large southern section of the built-up area spills over into the parish of Dodington (population 8,206), and as a result, the total population of Yate's urban area is estimated at 35,000.

Location
Yate is located in South Gloucestershire in the South West of England. Apart from Chipping Sodbury to the east, Yate is surrounded by countryside and is situated to the south-west of the Cotswolds. The A432 is the main road to serve Yate and runs through the centre of the town.

The Yate-Chipping Sodbury conurbation is near the centre of the South Gloucestershire district. It is situated between suburban Bristol to the southwest and the Cotswold escarpment to the northeast.

History

The first mention of Yate is the existence of a religious house in about AD 770; Yate is also mentioned in the Domesday Book of 1086. The name is derived from the Old English word giete or gete, meaning 'a gateway into a forest area'.

During the Anglo-Saxon period and well into medieval times, most of this part of south Gloucestershire was covered with forest. Through the centuries the land was cleared for farming.

The town's parish church, St Mary's, dates from Norman times. It was altered during the 15th century and was extensively restored in 1970. St Mary's Primary School, situated outside the churchyard walls, was built on the site of a former poorhouse.

It was the opening of the railway station in 1844, as part of Bristol and Gloucester Railway, that established Yate, with Station Road becoming the central thoroughfare. The cattle and produce markets were held around this road, and businesses were established there. Yate railway station was closed by the Beeching cuts in January 1965, but was reopened in May 1989; the Brunel-built engine shed is preserved nearby.

In the 1960s Yate was designated as a development area and the building boom began. The creation of a new town included a large retail shopping area, sports and leisure development together with public buildings.

When a secondary school was built in the late 1970s, it was supposed to be called Brinsham Green School, after Brinsham Lane at nearby Yate Rocks. Owing to a spelling error, however, it was in fact called Brimsham Green School.

The town further expanded in the 1990s and 2000s with the construction of housing at North Yate. This housing estate continued to use the corrupted name of Brimsham. To locals the area is known as Brimsham Park.

Yate railway yard
During the Second World War, a railway transfer yard was constructed for the United States Army, probably as part of Operation Bolero to assist the buildup of troops and stores before D-Day. Two large storage sheds survived on the site until 2008.

At the end of the Second World War, the site was taken over by the Royal Navy and became known as the Sea Transport Stores Depot. It was occupied by the Highways Agency until the sheds were demolished for development.

Oxford Archaeology has been commissioned to undertake an investigation as to the military significance of this site. The opinion of Bristol Industrial Archaeological Society has also been sought.

Design
Major growth in Yate started in the early 1920s with the construction of the Moorland Road estates behind Station Road, close to the Parnall aeroplane factory. In the 1950s the Ridge housing estate was developed. The area between these estates was still being mined for celestine and therefore could not be built on until the mineral had been extracted.

In the 1960s the area around Stanshawes was exhausted of celestine and the housing boom started with the major construction taking place in the south. Much of this development was planned using the Radburn model, a design that created a vehicle-free environment by the use of green spaces and linking paths at the front of the houses. This model was used until the late 1980s and early 1990s, when the planners reverted to traditional street design methods for the development of the remainder of North Yate, Brimsham Park and the Newmans factory site.

Administration

National 
Yate is represented in the UK Parliament by the constituency of Thornbury and Yate.

County
Historically part of Gloucestershire until 1974 it then became part of the district of Northavon within the newly formed county of Avon. In 1996, Avon was abolished, and the area became part of the unitary authority of South Gloucestershire and rejoined the ceremonial county of Gloucestershire.

Local
Yate Town Council provides local services, which are displayed on their website.

Industry
Before the Second World War, Yate had an aircraft manufacturing industry (Parnall) with a grass aerodrome. During the Second World War, Parnall specialised in making gun turrets. A number of people were killed in raids by the Luftwaffe on the factory in February and March 1941.

Following the war, the Parnall factory turned to the manufacture of domestic goods and was famous for its washing machines. In 1958 Parnall merged with Radiation Ltd to become known as Jackson, producing the Jackson range of cookers. Through mergers and acquisitions, Jacksons is now part of Indesit and the Jackson name is no longer used.

Newman's of Bristol had a large factory on Station Road, from 1932 until the 1980s, in its heyday in the 1960s, employing over 1,500 people.

Yate has had three natural products associated with it: limestone to the east, celestine or spar near the centre of the town and coal to the west.

The need for limestone increased with the growth of roads, while the demand for coal grew with the diminishing supply of timber. Celestine, the major strontium mineral, was first dug in the late 1880s and was initially used for the refining of sugar beet. At one time Yate's celestine accounted for 95 per cent of the world's production. It colours flames red, and so was important for pyrotechnics such as fireworks, military and signal flares and tracer bullets. The last commercial excavation of celestine from the Yate area was for use during the Vietnam War. The mining company, Bristol Mineral and Land Co, closed in 1994.

Amenities

The town has a skatepark at Peghill. Yate Common on Westerleigh Road is used for dog walking, nature watching, kite flying, circuses and fairs.

The common has a stretch of unused dual carriageway, known as the "Road to Nowhere", which has been used for filming in TV programmes such as Casualty. This was part of a scheme to create a bypass from Rodford Way in South Yate to Nibley. The scheme was only partially completed in 1974, the year when Yate became a part of Avon. Completion of the road would have entailed building a bridge over the railway, but finance for this was never made available.

The town has several parks and areas of open space. The largest of these is Kingsgate Park, which has an adventure playground for children.

The town is served by a community radio station, GLOSS FM which broadcasts 365 days a year on its webcasts and twice a year on 87.7 MHz FM.

A Cineworld cinema opened in the new Riverside shopping centre in April 2016.

The town benefits from a four appliance firestation, with a retained Crew 24 hours and then further tenders staffed on a voluntary basis. Next to the firestation is a 6 bay ambulance station with a further 3 ambulances and 2 response cars stabled outside.

Schools
Yate has two secondary schools, eight infant/junior schools and one special needs school.

Secondary schools
 Brimsham Green School
 Yate Academy (formerly King Edmunds School)
 Chipping Sodbury School

Primary schools
 North Road School 
 Abbotswood School
 Tyndale School
 St Mary's School
 St Paul's School
 The Ridge Juniors
 Broadway Infants
 Wellesley School
 Woodlands School

Special school
 Culverhill School
 South Gloucestershire Sports and Education

Shopping

Construction of a pedestrianised shopping centre of around a hundred shops began in the early-to-mid-1960s. The shopping centre was opened by Patricia Phoenix, Mary Rand and Ted Ray. As in most British new towns, modern art was incorporated, in the form of the Four Seasons sculpture, and a spire-shaped sculpture, which could be seen for miles. This sculpture existed until the early 1990s when it was removed during the revamping of the centre, which included the erection of glass roofs over the walkways. An extension to East Walk was constructed at the start of the 1980s, and an extension to West Walk was constructed in the early 1990s.

During the 1980s and into the mid-1990s, the shopping centre hosted Yate's annual festival. On opening day a celebrity launched the festival by releasing balloons.

In December 2006, the owners of the shopping centre (Dominion Corporate Trustees) announced plans to enlarge and modernise it. In Phase 1 one of the main changes has been the replacement of the existing small Tesco with a large Tesco Extra. To replace lost shopping centre parking following the enlargement, the store is on stilts, with parking beneath. It opened on 24 October 2011.

In 2008, construction of a new health centre began on the site of the old one, costing around £12 million. The West Gate Health Centre was officially opened on 8 March 2010.

In August 2009, plans were agreed for Tesco to pull down their store and replace it with a more modern store, known as a Tesco Extra. The plans include four more shop units, moving the bus station and a revamped entrance to East Walk. The revamp of the town's bus station was officially opened in January 2010. A temporary Tesco store was opened on 28 February 2011 while the new Tesco Extra was under construction. The old Tesco closed its doors on 27 February 2011 and the Tesco Extra store opened on 24 October 2011.

Plans
Yate and Chipping Sodbury have been earmarked for 5,000 new homes to be built by 2026. While the location of the housing has yet to be decided, the expected areas are to the north of Yate, and towards Chipping Sodbury.

Transport

Railway

Yate railway station serves the town. The railway station is located on the main Bristol to Birmingham line between Bristol Parkway and Cam & Dursley, and is operated by Great Western Railway.

Buses
Bus services within the Yate area are mainly provided by First West of England. Other operators who provide bus services to/from Yate include Coachstyle, Eurocoaches and Stagecoach West. 
 
Regular bus services link Yate with Bristol city centre. There are also buses from Yate running to Bath, Cribbs Causeway, Malmesbury, Tetbury and Westonbirt Arboretum. Additionally, buses link Yate to a number of other towns/villages within South Gloucestershire and west Wiltshire including Acton Turville, Badminton, Charfield, Chipping Sodbury, Downend, Emersons Green, Filton, Fishponds, Frenchay, Iron Acton, Kingswood, Luckington, Pucklechurch, Mangotsfield, Old Sodbury, Sherston, Staple Hill, Thornbury, Tormarton, Westerleigh, Wick, Winterbourne and Wotton-under-Edge. 

Buses in Yate pick up and set down at Yate Bus Station which is at Yate Shopping Centre. A number of bus services also pass Yate railway station. Yate Park and Ride is located at the western edge of the town and has services to the town centre and to Bristol.

Twin town
Yate is twinned with Bad Salzdetfurth in Germany and Genieri in Gambia.

Local sport

Athletics
Yate and District Athletic Club is a track-and-field club based at Yate Outdoor Sports Complex (YOSC).

Formed in 1983 by Mike Smith.

An eight-lane track was completed in December 1988 and formally opened by Olympian, Lynn Davies in 1989.

Floodlighting was added in 1992.

in 1997 Yate & District Athletic Club agreed to form partnership with Westbury Harriers

In 2020 the club joined the newly formed National Athletics League

Cricket
Chipping Sodbury Cricket Club is Yate's nearest cricket club, providing cricket for men, women, boys and girls. They play their home matches on their two grounds at the Ridings playing fields in Chipping Sodbury.

Football
Yate Town F.C. play in the Southern League Southern League Premier Division. There is also a ladies' football team, Yate Town Girls/Ladies FC, that play in local leagues.

Yate is also home to Yate United Youth F.C., the largest local youth only football club, established in 1971. They play their home matches at Yate Outdoor Sports Complex, Sunnyside Playing Fields and Kelston Close playing fields.

The largest local club is St. Nicholas F.C. Otherwise known as St. Nick's, this club has a total of 21 teams, including two ladies and one men's team. They play at The Ridings, Wickwar Road, Chipping Sodbury. The women's first team, St Nicholas L.F.C., play in South West Division One of the FA Women's Premier League, and play their home games at Yate Town's ground on Lodge Road.

Hockey
Yate Hockey Club runs teams from adult to junior. Its home ground is Yate Outdoor Sports Complex, which it shares with Badminton and Pucklechurch Hockey Club.

Rugby
Yate Rugby Football Club were founded 2016 by club owner and founder Stewart Stacey. The club play their home fixtures at Yate Outdoor Sports Complex. Yate RFC currently play under Gloucestershire RFU, in Bristol & District 2 league they finished fourth place in the 2018/19 season, their highest league position in the club's history. The club have a second team known as Yate Yaks that play friendlies and raise money for charity.

Martial arts
Bujinkan Kagami Dojo teaches traditional Ninjutsu and Samurai warrior arts at Yate Leisure Centre.

Yate Leisure Centre is also home to P.U.M.A. Yate Taekwon-do taught by Senior Master Ray Gayle VIII Degree Black Belt. The school has been running in Yate for 35 Years.

Estates in Yate

Abbotswood
Abbotswood has a small shopping centre, privately owned blocks of flats, a youth club and a church.

North Yate
Construction began in the late 1970s and early 1980s.

Brimsham Park
Construction of the estate began in the early 1990s.

The Ridge
The Ridge is a large housing estate with two local schools, Broadway Infants School and the Ridge Junior School. There are shops in the centre of the estate including a Nursery, Hairdressers, Dry Cleaners, convenience store and dentists.

Ladden
Construction of a new garden village started at the northern side of Yate in Summer 2018. As of 2020 it is still under construction.

Notable residents
 J.K. Rowling, author of the Harry Potter fantasy series, was born in 1965 at the Chipping Sodbury Maternity Hospital (later the Chipping Sodbury Memorial Day Centre), on Station Road, Yate. Until the age of four, she lived with her parents in Sundridge Park, Yate. The Chipping Sodbury Memorial Day Centre was sold by the North Bristol NHS trust in 2012 and has now been converted to 9 luxury apartments.
 Cole Skuse, (born 29 March 1986) professional footballer.
 The artist Banksy is believed to be Robin Gunningham, born on 28 July 1973.

Location grid

References

External links

Towns in Gloucestershire
South Gloucestershire District
Civil parishes in Gloucestershire
Radburn design housing estates